In certain denominations of Christianity, hygiene in Christianity includes a number of regulations involving cleanliness before prayer, as well as those concerning diet and apparel.

History 

The Bible has many rituals of purification relating to menstruation, childbirth, sexual relations, nocturnal emission, unusual bodily fluids, skin disease, death, and animal sacrifices. In the Old Testament, ablution was considered a prerequisite to approaching God, whether by means of sacrifice, prayer, or entering a holy place. 

Christianity has always placed a strong emphasis on hygiene. Water plays a role in the Christian rituals. A major contribution of the Christian missionaries in Africa, China, Guatemala, India, Indonesia, Korea, and other places was better health care of the people through hygiene and introducing and distributing the soaps, and "cleanliness and hygiene became an important marker of being identified as a Christian".

Early Christian clergy condemned the practice of mixed bathing as practiced by the Romans, such as the pagan custom of women naked bathing in front of men; as such, the Didascalia Apostolorum, an early Christian manual, enjoined Christians to bathe themselves in those facilities that were separated by sex, which contributed to hygiene and good health according to the Church Fathers, such as Clement of Alexandria and Tertullian. The Church also built public bathing facilities that were separate for both sexes near monasteries and pilgrimage sites; also, the popes situated baths within church basilicas and monasteries since the early Middle Ages. Pope Gregory the Great urged his followers on the value of bathing as a bodily need.

Great bathhouses were built in Byzantine centers such as Constantinople and Antioch, and the popes allocated to the Romans bathing through diaconia, or private Lateran baths, or even a myriad of monastic bath houses functioning in eighth and ninth centuries. The popes maintained their baths in their residences which described by scholar Paolo Squatriti as "luxurious baths", and bath houses including hot baths incorporated into Christian church buildings or those of monasteries, which known as "charity baths" because they served both the clerics and needy poor people. Public bathing were common in medieval Christendom larger towns and cities such as Paris, Regensburg and Naples. Catholic religious orders of the Augustinians' and Benedictines' rules contained ritual purification, and inspired by Benedict of Nursia encouragement for the practice of therapeutic bathing; Benedictine monks played a role in the development and promotion of spas. Protestant Christianity also played a prominent role in the development of the British spas.

In  Pope Nicholas V commissioned building a bath palace in Viterbo, and the construction at the Bagno del Papa was continued on through the reigns of several popes after Nicholas V. The Vatican accounts mention payments "for building done at the bath palace of Viterbo" during the reigns of Calixtus III, Paul II, and Sixtus IV. There also is evidence Pope Pius II was responsible for the addition of a western wing to the building.

Contrary to popular belief bathing and sanitation were not lost in Europe with the collapse of the Roman Empire. Soapmaking first became an established trade during the so-called "Dark Ages". The Romans used scented oils (mostly from Egypt), among other alternatives. By the 15th century, the manufacture of soap in Christendom had become virtually industrialized, with sources in Antwerp, Castile, Marseille, Naples and Venice. In the 17th century the Spanish Catholic manufacturers purchased the monopoly on Castile soap from the cash-strapped Carolinian government. By the mid-19th century, the English urbanised middle classes had formed an ideology of cleanliness that ranked alongside typical Victorian concepts of moralism, such as Christianity, respectability and social progress. The Salvation Army has adopted the deployment of personal hygiene, and by providing personal hygiene products, such as a toothbrush, toothpaste, and soap.

Believing that on Epiphany day water becomes holy and is imbued with special powers, Eastern Orthodox cut holes in the ice of lakes and rivers, often in the shape of the cross, to bathe in the freezing water.  Christianity strongly affected the development of holy wells in Europe and the Middle East, and its water are known for its healing properties.

The use of water in many Christian countries is due in part to the biblical toilet etiquette which encourages washing after all instances of defecation. The bidet is common in predominantly Catholic countries where water is considered essential for anal cleansing, and in some traditionally Orthodox and Lutheran countries such as Greece and Finland respectively, where bidet showers are common.

Washing before Christian prayer and worship 

Around the time of Tertullian, an early Church Father, it was customary for Christians to wash their hands (manulavium), face (capitilavium) and feet (pedilavium) before prayer, as well as before receiving Holy Communion. Churches from the time of Constantine the Great  were thus built with an esonarthex that included a fountain known as a cantharus, where Christians would wash their hands, face and feet before entering the worship space (cf. ); they continue to be used in Orthodox Christian churches. The practice of ablutions before prayer and worship in Christianity symbolizes "separation from sins of the spirit and surrender to the Lord."

As early as the 2nd century, Christians hung a cross on the east wall of their houses, to which they prostrated in front of, as they prayed at seven fixed prayer times (cf. ). Before praying these canonical hours at seven fixed prayer times in the eastward direction of prayer, Christians belonging to the Mar Thoma Syrian Church, an Oriental Protestant denomination, as well as the Oriental Orthodox Churches such as the Coptic Orthodox Church, Indian Orthodox Church and Ethiopian Orthodox Church, wash their hands, face and feet (cf. Shehimo and Agpeya).

Oriental Orthodox Churches such as the Coptic Orthodox, Ethiopian Orthodox, Eritrean Orthodox, places a heavier emphasis on Old Testament teachings, and its followers adhere to certain practices such as observeing days of ritual purification. 

In Oriental Orthodox Christianity, as with some Western Orthodox Christian traditions, shoes are removed in order to acknowledge that one is offering prayer before a holy God.

Among Old Ritualists in the Russian Christian tradition, a prayer rug known as a Podruchnik is used to keep one's face and hands clean during prostrations, as these parts of the body are used to make the sign of the cross.

Christian denominations of the Schwarzenau Brethren tradition practice footwashing in their regular celebrations of the Lovefeast, prior to receiving Holy Communion and eating.

Sex and menstruation 
In Oriental Orthodox Christianity, the "holiness of the Church is traditionally tied scripturally with the Jerusalem Temple". As such, believers fast after midnight and "sexual intercourse is prohibited the night before communion" (cf. Eucharistic discipline).

In the Ethiopian Orthodox Church, an Oriental Orthodox Christian denomination, men are not permitted to enter a church the day after they have had sexual intercourse with their wives. People who are ritually unclean may approach the church but are not permitted to enter it; they instead stand near the church door and pray during the liturgy. The Ethiopian Orthodox Tewahedo Church prescribes several kinds of hand washing for example after leaving the latrine, lavatory or bathhouse, or before prayer, or after eating a meal.

Pope Dionysius of Alexandria taught that with regard to menstruating women that "not even they themselves, being faithful and pious, would dare when in this state either to approach the Holy Table or to touch the body and blood of Christ." As such, Oriental Orthodox Christian women, such as those belonging to the Coptic Orthodox Church, are not permitted to receive Holy Communion while they are menstruating.

Covenant theology largely views the Christian sacrament of baptism as fulfilling the Israelite practice of circumcision, both being signs and seals of the covenant of grace (cf. Circumcision controversy in early Christianity). Since the Council of Florence, the Roman Catholic Church forbade the practice of circumcision among Christians, a position also taught by the Lutheran Church; Roman Catholic scholars, including John J. Dietzen, David Lang, and Edwin F. Healy, teach that "elective male infant circumcision not only violates the proper application of the time-honored principle of totality, but even fits the ethical definition of mutilation, which is gravely sinful." Roman Catholicism generally is silent today with respect to its permissibility, though elective circumcision continues to be debated amongst theologians. On the other hand, circumcision is an established practice and customary in Coptic Christianity, the Ethiopian Orthodox Church and the Eritrean Orthodox Church, all of which observe it as a rite of passage, and males are generally required to be circumcised shortly after birth. Even though mainstream Christian denominations do not require the practice and maintain a neutral position on it, circumcision is widely practiced in many Christian countries and communities.

Christian dietary laws and fasting 

In the Ethiopian Orthodox Church, an Oriental Orthodox Christian denomination, washing one's hands is required before and after consuming food. This is followed by prayer, in which Christians often pray to ask God to thank Him for and bless their food before consuming it at the time of eating meals, such as breakfast. The wording of these mealtime prayers vary per Christian denomination, e.g. the common table prayer is used by communicants of the Lutheran Churches and the Moravian Church.

Vegetarianism was widespread in the early Church, among both the clergy and laity. Since eating meat was traditionally viewed as a luxury, many Christians may choose to practice vegetarianism as their Lenten sacrifice during the penetential season of Lent in the Christian calendar.

With respect to meat consumption, in Oriental Orthodox Christianity, in denominations such as the Armenian Apostolic Church and Ethiopian Orthodox Church, slaughtering animals for food is done with one strike in the name of the trinitarian formula (cf. Jhatka).

Meat consumed by Christians should not retain any blood.

The Friday Fast from meat is observed by Christians of the Catholic, Methodist and Anglican traditions, especially during the season of Lent in the Christian calendar.

The Baptist, Methodist and Pentecostal traditions of Christianity prohibit the consumption of alcohol (cf. teetotalism). On the other hand other Christian denominations condone moderate drinking of alcohol, including the Catholic, Lutheran and Eastern Orthodox traditions. However, all Christian Churches, in view of the biblical teaching on drunkenness, universally condemn drunkenness as sinful.

External apparel 

In Christianity, communicants of the Oriental Orthodox and Eastern Orthodox Churches are expected to wear a cross necklace at all times; these are ordinarily given to believers at their baptism. This practice is derived from Canon 73 and Canon 82 of the Sixth Ecumenical Council (Synod) of Constantinople, which declared:

Christian headcovering with a cloth veil was universally taught by the Church Fathers. As such, in many Christian denominations, such as the Oriental Orthodox Churches and Old Ritualists of the Russian Christian tradition, as well in the Anabaptist Churches, women wear headcoverings when praying and worshipping.

In denominations of the conservative holiness movement such as the Allegheny Wesleyan Methodist Connection and Evangelical Wesleyan Church, when in public, women are enjoined to wear clothing with sleeves extended past the elbows and "Women's hemlines are to be modestly below the knees" (cf. outward holiness).

See also 

Churching of women
Islamic hygienical jurisprudence
Religion and health

References 

Ritual purity in Christianity
Hygiene
Health law
Religion and health